Ab Saraft (also Romanized as Āb Saraft) is a village in Harazpey-ye Jonubi Rural District, in the Central District of Amol County, Mazandaran Province, Iran. At the 2006 census, its population was 192, in 52 families.

References 

Populated places in Amol County